The idea of ministerial discretion, when employed in Canadian statute law, means the power of a Crown minister to vary or alter the decisions of his bureaucrats, one of his Committees, or one of his Boards. The idea derives from the laws of the United Kingdom, of which Canada, under the rubric of British North America, once was part. The term needs to be written into the statute, as for example in section 51 of the Canadian Oil and Gas Operations Act:

SCC definition
In 1999, as it appeared to Justice L'Heureux-Dubé and her majority,

Immigration, refugees, citizenship and extradition 

In special cases enumerated under section 5(4) of the legislation, the Minister is empowered at his discretion to grant citizenship or other immigration status, as described in Baker v Canada.

Idziak v Canada dealt with an extradition case, in which the appellant, who was wanted by the Attorney-General of the US, sought to remain in Canada. The Minister refused to exercise his discretionary authority not to surrender the appellant to American justice.

Education
The Quebec Minister of Education sought to impose upon Loyola High School his own syllabus, in disregard of explicit legislated instruction. It appeared to Abella J that

Fisheries
The Minister in charge of the Department of Fisheries and Oceans disregarded a non-discretionary regime that was imposed upon him in Species at Risk Act, and tried to substitute it for a discretionary power he found in the Fisheries Act. He was overruled by the Federal Court of Appeal in DFO v David Suzuki Foundation.

Investment Canada Act
In certain circumstances, Canadian corporations subject to foreign takeover bids are entitled to the discretion of the Minister for Industry and, if the Minister decides that the proposed takeover is not of “net benefit” to Canada, it fails.

References

Canadian administrative law